The 1966 Tour de France started with 130 cyclists, divided into 13 teams of 10 cyclists:

Felice Gimondi, winner of the 1965 Tour de France, did not defend his title.

Start list

By team

By rider

By nationality

References

1966 Tour de France
1966